In Greek mythology, Azeus (Ancient Greek: Ἀζεύς) was a Minyan prince as the youngest among the sons of King Clymenus of Orchomenus and Boudeia, daughter of Lycus. He was the brother of Erginus, Stration, Arrhon, Pyleus, Eurydice and Axia. Azeus was the father of King Actor, father of Astyoche who coupled with Ares and begat Ascalaphus and Ialmenus, the Orchomenian leaders during the Trojan War.

Mythology 
Azeus went with his brothers, under the command of Erginus against Thebes, to take vengeance for the murder of his father, who had been slain by the Thebans at a festival of the Onchestian Poseidon.

Notes

References 

 Homer, The Iliad with an English Translation by A.T. Murray, Ph.D. in two volumes. Cambridge, MA., Harvard University Press; London, William Heinemann, Ltd. 1924. . Online version at the Perseus Digital Library.
 Homer, Homeri Opera in five volumes. Oxford, Oxford University Press. 1920. . Greek text available at the Perseus Digital Library.
 Homer, The Odyssey with an English Translation by A.T. Murray, PH.D. in two volumes. Cambridge, MA., Harvard University Press; London, William Heinemann, Ltd. 1919. . Online version at the Perseus Digital Library. Greek text available from the same website.
 Pausanias, Description of Greece with an English Translation by W.H.S. Jones, Litt.D., and H.A. Ormerod, M.A., in 4 Volumes. Cambridge, MA, Harvard University Press; London, William Heinemann Ltd. 1918. . Online version at the Perseus Digital Library
 Pausanias, Graeciae Descriptio. 3 vols. Leipzig, Teubner. 1903.  Greek text available at the Perseus Digital Library.
 Stephanus of Byzantium, Stephani Byzantii Ethnicorum quae supersunt, edited by August Meineike (1790-1870), published 1849. A few entries from this important ancient handbook of place names have been translated by Brady Kiesling. Online version at the Topos Text Project.

Princes in Greek mythology

Minyan characters in Greek mythology